The 2010 Individual Speedway World Championship Grand Prix Qualification were a series of motorcycle speedway meetings used to determine the three riders who qualified for the 2010 Speedway Grand Prix. The top eight riders finishing the 2009 Grand Prix series automatically qualified for 2010. The final round of qualification – the Grand Prix Challenge – took place on 18 September 2009, in Coventry, England. The Grand Prix Challenge was won by Magnus Zetterström who finished ahead of Chris Holder and former Grand Prix rider Jarosław Hampel. All three riders qualified for the 2010 Grand Prix.

Calendar

Domestic Qualifications 
Deutscher Motor Sport Bund nominated five riders and two track reserve in February 2009. Avto-Moto Zveza Slovenije nominated three riders in March 2009.

Czech Republic 
Autoklub of the Czech Republic nominated six riders in October 2008: Lukáš Dryml, Aleš Dryml, Jr., Luboš Tomíček, Jr., Adrian Rymel, Matěj Kůs and Filip Šitera. A last rider, who will be started in SGP Qualification will be nominated in 2009.

Poland 
The top three riders from 2008 Golden Helmet Final qualified for Grand Prix Qualification (Damian Baliński, Jarosław Hampel and Adrian Miedziński). Four riders will be qualified after Domestic Final. Last rider and one reserve will be nominated by Main Commission of Speedway Sport. Two Polish 2009 Speedway Grand Prix permanent (Rune Holta and Grzegorz Walasek will be started in Domestic Final. Tomasz Gollob (#3) and Sebastian Ułamek (#14) will be not started.

  (Final of Domestic Qualification to Individual World Championship Grand Prix)
 7 April 2009 (18:00)
  Gdańsk
 Referee: Andrzej Terlecki
 Beat Time: 63.26 - Piotr Protasiewicz (heat 3)
Qualify: 4 and 1 + 1R by Main Commission of Speedway Sport

Qualifying rounds

Semi-finals

Motala 

 Semi-Final 1
 4 July 2009 (16:00 UTV+2)
  Motala, Lastpartner Arena (Length: 291 m)
 Referee:  Pavel Vana
 Jury President:  Anthony Noel
 Qualify: 8 + 1 reserve
 Changes: 
No. 9  Sebastian Ułamek (injured) replaced by track reserve Tai Woffinden

|width=50% valign=top|

Daugavpils 
 Semi-Final 2
 4 July 2009 (15:00 UTC +3)
  Daugavpils, Latvijas Spidveja Centrs (Length: 373 metres)
 Referee:  Mick Bates
 Jury President:  Boris Kotnjek
 Times:
 Heat 3: 67.6 - Bogdanovs (new track record)
 Heat 6: 66.9 - Pavlic (new track record)
 Changes:
No. 4  Thomas H. Jonasson replaced by track reserve Andriy Karpov
No. 1  Leon Madsen replaced by track reserve Tobias Kroner
No. 2  Patrick Hougaard replaced by James Wright

|}

Grand Prix Challenge 
 Grand Prix Challenge
 18 September 2009 (20:00 UTC+1)
  Coventry
 Referee:  Christian Froschauer
 Jury President:  Ilkka Teromaa
 Qualify to the 2010 Speedway Grand Prix: top three
 Changes:
(18)  Tobias Kroner → A.Dryml, Jr. → Risager
(17)  Antonio Lindbäck → A.Dryml, Jr.

See also 
Speedway Grand Prix

References 

2010

World Individual